Central Coast Roller Derby is a women's flat track roller derby league based in Paso Robles, California. Founded in 2006, Central Coast Roller Derby is a member of the Women's Flat Track Derby Association (WFTDA).

History and organization
The league was founded by Carey Jones, who skates as "Cheeba", and Heather Coss, "Rotten Peaches", in January 2006.  It quickly developed a dual focus, both on playing the sport, and on raising money for charity. In 2007, members of the league appeared in a music video for the Static-X single, "Destroyer".

The league affiliated with the Women's Flat Track Derby Association (WFTDA), but in 2010 a spokesperson noted that their short-term priorities were to move up in the rankings, rather than to qualify for the WFTDA Western Regional Tournament.

In 2012, Central Coast instituted three home teams to compete against each other the A-Town Asylum, the Broad St. Brawlers, and Paso Aggressive. The home teams were later disbanded.

WFTDA rankings

References

Roller derby leagues in California
Paso Robles, California
Roller derby leagues established in 2006
Women's Flat Track Derby Association Division 3
2006 establishments in California